The Auschwitz trial began on November 24, 1947, in Kraków, when Poland's Supreme National Tribunal tried forty former staff of the Auschwitz concentration camps. The trials ended on December 22, 1947.

The best-known defendants were Arthur Liebehenschel, former commandant; Maria Mandel, head of the Auschwitz women's camps; and SS-doctor Johann Kremer. Thirty-seven other SS officers—thirty-three men and four women—who had served as guards or doctors in the camps were also tried.

Verdict of the Supreme National Tribunal in the first Auschwitz trial  

Rudolf Höss, sentenced in a previous trial, was executed on April 16, 1947, in front of the crematorium at Auschwitz I. The trial of camp commandant Höss, which took place at the Supreme National Tribunal in Warsaw throughout March 1947, was the first trial held at Auschwitz, followed by the trials in Kraków several months later.

Summary
The Supreme National Tribunal presiding in Kraków issued 23 death sentences, and 17 imprisonments ranging from life sentences to 3 years. All executions were carried out on January 24, 1948, at the Kraków Montelupich Prison, "one of the most terrible Nazi prisons in occupied Poland" used by Gestapo throughout World War II. Maria Mandel and Therese Brandl were the first to be executed.  One person was acquitted; Sergeant Major Hans Münch, who refused to participate in the selection process and made futile, although confirmed, requests for more food to the inmates.

Liebehenschel, Mandel and Kremer were condemned to death, as were Hans Aumeier, August Bogusch, Therese Brandl, Arthur Breitwieser, Fritz Buntrock, Wilhelm Gehring, Paul Götze, Maximilian Grabner, Heinrich Josten, Hermann Kirschner, Josef Kollmer, Franz Kraus, Herbert Ludwig, Karl Möckel, Kurt Mueller, Eric Muhsfeldt, Ludwig Plagge, Hans Schumacher and Paul Szczurek (Arthur Breitwieser and Johann Kremer had their sentences commuted to life imprisonment). Luise Danz, Hans Koch, Anton Lechner, Adolf Medefind, Detlef Nebbe, and Karl Seufert received life sentences. Alexander Bülow, Hans Hoffmann, Hildegard Lächert, Eduard Lorenz, Alice Orlowski, Franz Romeikat, and Johannes Weber were sentenced to 15 years. Richard Schroeder received 10 years, Erich Dinges five years, and Karl Jeschke three years. Hans Münch was acquitted.

See also
 Belzec trial before the 1st Munich District Court in the mid-1960s, eight SS-men of the Belzec extermination camp tried, seven acquitted
 Chełmno trials of the Chełmno extermination camp personnel, held in Poland and in Germany. The cases were decided almost twenty years apart
 Dachau trials held within the walls of the former Dachau concentration camp, 1945–1948
 Majdanek trials, the longest Nazi war crimes trial in history, spanning over 30 years
 Nuremberg trials of the 23 most important leaders of the Third Reich, 1945–1946
 Sobibor trial held in Hagen, Germany in 1965, concerning the Sobibor extermination camp

Notes and references

 Cyprian T., Sawicki J., Siedem wyroków Najwyższego Trybunału Narodowego, Poznań, 1962
 G. Álvarez, Mónica. "Guardianas Nazis. El lado femenino del mal". Madrid: Grupo Edaf, 2012. 

 
Trials in Poland
Holocaust trials